Raghavjibhai Hansrajbhai Patel is an Indian politician currently serving as Cabinet Minister of Agriculture, Animal Husbandry in Government of Gujarat. He was elected to the Gujarat Legislative Assembly from Jamnagar Gramya in the 2012 Gujarat Legislative Assembly election as a member of the Indian National Congress.

He was one of the four members of the Indian National Congress who shifted to Bharatiya Janata Party post 2017 Gujarat Legislative Assembly election. He won the by-election in 2019 from the same seat.

References

Living people
Gujarat MLAs 2012–2017
Bharatiya Janata Party politicians from Gujarat
Indian National Congress politicians from Gujarat
People from Jamnagar
Year of birth missing (living people)
Gujarat MLAs 2017–2022